Astronium graveolens is a species of flowering tree in the cashew family, Anacardiaceae, that is native to Mexico, Central America, and South America as far south as Bolivia. Common names include glassywood, ronrón (Spanish), and aroeira (Portuguese). This plant is cited in Flora Brasiliensis by Carl Friedrich Philipp von Martius.

Description
The crown is rounded with irregular branches. The bark is grey, shiny and smooth, with paler patches where pieces have peeled off. The leaves are alternate and pinnate, with five to seven oblong or obovate leaflets with pointed tips. The tree flowers during the dry season. The flowers are hermaphrodite, small, yellowish-green in axillary or terminal panicles. The fruit is a drupe-like nut, blue ripening to black, with semi bitter flesh and a single seed.
This plant is also called "gateado", according to Webster's Third New International Dictionary

Timber
When fresh, the heartwood of Astronium graveolens is reddish-brown or orange-brown with variable width stripes of medium to dark brown. The timber becomes darker after exposure to the air and the stripes become nearly black. The timber is fine-grained, dense and durable, and resistant to rot. It is used for heavy duty construction work, joinery, veneers and furniture. Speciality uses include turnery, carving, knife handles, brush backs, bows for archery and billiard cues.

References

External links
Astronium fraxinifolium
 Astronium graveolens
 Astronium graveolens photo
 Flora Brasiliensis: Astronium graveolens

graveolens
Trees of Brazil
Trees of Central America
Trees of Mexico
Trees of Venezuela
Trees of western South America
Flora of the Atlantic Forest
Flora of the Cerrado
Plants described in 1760
Taxa named by Nikolaus Joseph von Jacquin